Air100 was a Finnish regional airline. Air100 began daily flights from Pori to Helsinki in September 2012. They flew to up to five regional destinations across Finland, with Helsinki - Pori being the last remaining route as of June 2014.

Air100 flights were operated by the Czech Central Connect Airlines (CCA), which used two Saab 340 aircraft for these until CCA ceased operations in June 2014. Therefore, the Air100 flights between Helsinki and Pori ceased until further notice.

References

External links 
 

Defunct airlines of Finland
Airlines established in 2012
Airlines disestablished in 2016
Finnish companies established in 2012
2012 establishments in Finland
2016 disestablishments in Finland